The Telescope is a studio album by Her Space Holiday which was released in 2006 only on a Japanese label.  The songs have a consistent theme and tell a story of love and isolation with varying degrees of melancholy, hope, conflict, fulfillment and alienation.  They are apparently written about the same woman.  The cover depicts a room full of books with a boy staring through a telescope directly at a girl standing at the other end.  There are themes of conflict in the lyrics not just between the lovers but with unlabeled enemies.  Most of the tracks are instrumental with titles to indicate which part of the story they relate to.  The final track is an extended spoken word story of the love between the two.

Track list 
 The Telescope (Theme Song) - 3:40
 Epic (Days Upon Days) - 3:11
 Sunday Morning (Where Are You Going) - 3:05
 You Have My Heart (A New Emotion) - 3:17
 Golden (Leaving You Here With Nothing) - 3:16
 Atmosphere (We Drew A Map Together) - 3:43 
 Sad Wireless (Back To Where He Started) - 3:18
 Candle (Battered And Broken) - 3:13
 Save A Place For Me (Just A Feeling) - 3:36
 The Telescope Reading (Of Course) - 8:28

2006 albums
Her Space Holiday albums